Lake Kwangpo lies near the coast of South Hamgyong Province of North Korea.  A  site encompassing the lake, including adjacent rice paddies and the  Lake Kwangpo Protected Area, has been identified by BirdLife International as an Important Bird Area (IBA) because it supports populations of various water- and wetland birds.  Birds for which the site is of conservation significance include swan geese, greater white-fronted geese, mute swans, whooper swans, grey herons, Swinhoe's rails, white-naped cranes and red-crowned cranes.

References

Important Bird Areas of North Korea
Kwangpo
South Hamgyong